Manuela Fingueret (August 9, 1945 – March 11, 2013) was an Argentine writer and educator.

Biography
The daughter of Lithuanian-Jewish immigrants, she was born in the La Chacarita barrio of Buenos Aires and studied to become a teacher and journalist. Fingueret was director of the Area de Cultura Judia del Centro Cultural General San Martin. She was programming director for FM Jai, a Jewish radio station and worked for several Jewish publications, including Nueva Sion and Arca del Sur'.

In 1975, she published her first collection of poetry Tumultos contenidos (Contained tumult). It was followed by Heredarás Babel (You will inherit Babylon) in 1977 and La piedra es una llaga en el tiempo (The stone is a wound in time) in 1980.

Fingueret was a long-time fan of the Atlanta soccer club and was given an honorary lifetime membership to the club in 2006.

 Selected works 
 Ciudad en fuga y otros infiernos (City in flight and other hells), poetry (1984)
 Eva y las máscaras (Eve and the masks), poetry (1987)
 Las picardías de Hérshele (Hershele's mischief), children's book (1989)
 Los huecos de tu cuerpo (The hollows of your body), poetry (1992)
 Blues de la calle Leiva (Leiva street blues), novel (1995)
 Hija del silencio'' (Daughter of silence), novel (2000)

See also
 Lists of writers

References 

1945 births
2013 deaths
Argentine Jews
Argentine women poets
Jewish Argentine writers
Jewish women writers
Argentine women novelists
Argentine women journalists
Argentine essayists
Argentine women essayists
Argentine people of Lithuanian-Jewish descent
Writers from Buenos Aires
20th-century Argentine women writers
20th-century Argentine writers
20th-century Argentine poets
20th-century Argentine novelists
20th-century essayists
21st-century Argentine novelists
21st-century Argentine women writers
21st-century Argentine writers